Anders Hove (8 January 1885  –  14 February 1978) was a Norwegian politician for the Labour Party.

He was born in Fåberg.

He was elected to the Norwegian Parliament from the Market towns of Hedmark and Oppland counties in 1945, and was re-elected on two occasions.

Hove held various positions in Lillehammer city council, and served as deputy mayor in 1945.

References

1885 births
1978 deaths
Labour Party (Norway) politicians
Members of the Storting
20th-century Norwegian politicians